Julio César Ortellado (born 24 May 1978 in Mariano Roque Alonso, Paraguay) is a Paraguayan former professional footballer who played as a forward.

References

External links
 
 

1974 births
Living people
People from Mariano Roque Alonso
Association football forwards
Paraguayan footballers
Paraguayan expatriate footballers
C.D. Antofagasta footballers
Rangers de Talca footballers
Deportivo Recoleta footballers
Club Tacuary footballers
Club Libertad footballers
Sportivo Luqueño players
Club Nacional footballers
Deportes Tolima footballers
General Caballero Sport Club footballers
Sarmiento de Resistencia footballers
Paraguayan Primera División players
Categoría Primera A players
Expatriate footballers in Chile
Expatriate footballers in Colombia
Paraguayan expatriate sportspeople in Chile
Paraguayan expatriate sportspeople in Colombia